Donald E. Heath (born June 20, 1928) is an American politician who served as a Republican member for the 118th district of the Florida House of Representatives from 1968 to 1970.

Heath was born in Waukegan, Illinois. He moved to Florida in 1957. In 1968, he was elected for the 118th district of the Florida House of Representatives, succeeding Kent S. McKinley. In 1970, he was succeeded by Robert M. Johnson.

References 

1928 births
Living people
People from Waukegan, Illinois
Republican Party members of the Florida House of Representatives
20th-century American politicians